Ihor Naumovich Shamo (Ukrainian Iгор Наумович Шамо; Russian: Игорь Наумович Шамо, also Romanized Igor; 21 February 1925 – 17 August 1982) was a Ukrainian composer.

Shamo was born in Kiev to a family of Jewish origin. He graduated from the Lysenko Music School in Kiev, where his main subjects were composition and piano, in 1941, and was evacuated in that year to Ufa, where he studied medicine for two years. From 1942 to 1946 he was in the Soviet Army as a medical assistant; when he returned to Kiev he recommenced his musical studies, graduating from the Kiev Conservatory in 1951 in the class of Boris Lyatoshinsky. He had joined the Union of Soviet Composers in 1948, and at his graduation played his own Concert-Ballade for piano and orchestra.

His popular song Kyieve Mii (My Kyiv) is regarded as the "unofficial anthem of the Ukrainian capital", and is cited on his memorial on the building where he lived (see picture). His other works include three symphonies, and an opera Yatranskiye Igri, which is unusually scored for a cappella choir and soloists.

Selected filmography
 Maksimka (1953)
 Malva (1957)
 E.A. — Extraordinary Accident (1958)
Far from the Motherland (1960)
 Flower on the Stone (1962)

References
Notes

Sources
 Nevichana, Tamara (n.d.). "Shamo, Ihor Naumovich" (in Ukrainian), on website of National Union of Ukrainian Composers, accessed 21 May 2014.
 Shurova, Nina (n.d.). "Shamo, Ihor", in Oxford Music Online , accessed 21 May 2014.

Ukrainian classical composers
1925 births
1982 deaths
Burials at Baikove Cemetery
Ukrainian songwriters
Musicians from Kyiv
Ukrainian opera composers
Jewish opera composers
Soviet opera composers
Soviet military personnel of World War II
20th-century classical composers